Carey Bonner, Rev  (1 May 1859 – 16 June 1938) was a Baptist minister who served as the General Secretary of the National Sunday School Union from 1900 until 1929 and as Joint Secretary of the World Sunday School Association.

Biography

Bonner was born in Southwark, Surrey. A composer and hymnist, he wrote and arranged hymns, choral works and sacred cantatas and compiled a number of hymnals. He is known for The Sunday School Hymnary (1905) and The Baptist Church Hymnal (1933). His Ministerial training was at Rawdon Baptist College in Leeds. He was ordained in 1884, and ministered in Sale, near Manchester (1884-1895), and at the Portland Chapel, Southampton (1895-1900). He was Secretary of the Lancashire & Cheshire Association of Baptist Churches 1893-189. He went on to become involved in the Sunday School movement,  secretary in 1900, and president of the National Sunday School Union (1922-1923). He was President of the Baptist Union of Great Britain from 1931 to 1932.

Selected works 

Some Baptist Hymnists from the Seventeenth Century to Modern Times, 1937

The Sunday School Hymnary, 1905

Bunyan the Dreamer (sacred cantata) 1928

The Romance of the English Bible, 1927

The Baptist Church Hymnal, 1933

The Christian Endeavour Hymnal, 1904

Three Choral Benedictions: 1. Of Grace and Peace. 2. Of Farewell. 3. Of the Trinity, c. 1890

The Blind Maid of Bethany (sacred cantata) c.1910

The New Crusaders  (sacred cantata) 1914

The Ship of Adventure:The story of the "Mayflower"  (sacred cantata) 1920

Day-dawn: the Story of a Noble Venture: the Sunday School and Robert Raikes (sacred cantata) 1930

Greatheart: The Story of John Pounds (sacred cantata) 1934

SOURCE: COPAC

Christian hymnwriters
English composers
19th-century British composers
20th-century British composers
People from Surrey (before 1889)
1859 births
1938 deaths